Trouble Backstairs is a 1949 West German comedy film directed by Erich Kobler and starring Paul Dahlke, Fita Benkhoff and Ursula Herking. It was based on a play of the same title by Maximilian Böttcher, which had previously been turned into the 1935 film Trouble Backstairs.

Cast
 Paul Dahlke as August Krüger
 Fita Benkhoff as Irma Schulze
 Ursula Herking as Malchen Krüger
 Bruni Löbel as Edeltraud Panse
 Traute Rose as Frau Bock
 Gisela von Jagen as Ilse Bock, ihre Tochter
 Carl Kuhlmann as Oberpostschaffner Hermann Schulze
 Ilse Melcher as Paula, seine Tochter
 Bum Krüger as Gustav Kluge, Bäckermeister
 Ernst von Klipstein as Assessor Dr. Erich Horn
 Friedrich Domin as Justizrat Dr. Horn, sein Vater
 Franz Schafheitlin as Prosecutor
 Walter Janssen as Amtsgerichtsrat Meier
 Hilli Wildenhain as Frau Puschke

References

Bibliography 
 Goble, Alan. The Complete Index to Literary Sources in Film. Walter de Gruyter, 1 Jan 1999.

External links 
 

1949 films
West German films
German comedy films
German black-and-white films
1949 comedy films
1940s German-language films
Films directed by Erich Kobler
German films based on plays
Remakes of German films
1940s German films